Mátyás Tóth (also known as Mátyás Tóth III; 1 April 1918 – 12 February 2002) was a Hungarian–Romanian footballer who played as a forward for teams such as Újpest, Nagyváradi AC, ITA Arad or Vasas, among others.

International career
Tóth III played at international level in 16 matches for Hungary, scoring 6 times and in 2 matches for Romania, also scoring a goal. He was also part of Hungary's squad at the 1936 Summer Olympics, but he did not play in any matches.

Honours
Nagyváradi AC
Nemzeti Bajnokság I: 1943–44

ITA Arad
Divizia A: 1946–47

References

External links
 
 
 Mátyás Tóth at magyarfutball.hu (in Hungarian)

1918 births
2002 deaths
People from Békés
Hungarian footballers
Romanian footballers
Hungary international footballers
Romania international footballers
Association football forwards
Nemzeti Bajnokság I players
Újpest FC players
CA Oradea players
Vasas SC players
Liga I players
FC UTA Arad players
Dual internationalists (football)
Sportspeople from Békés County